Old Friends is a trade paperback collecting comic stories based on the Angel television series.

Story description

Angel: Old Friends #1

A vampiric figure seems to be causing a string of deaths in LA, so Angel must return to the city to investigate with Gunn. The case reunites him with old friends and old enemies.

Angel: Old Friends #2

Having learned that Spike had a doppelganger, the vampiric-like killings continue across L.A., and Angel is drawn back into the city.

Angel: Old Friends #3

Angel learns he may not be able to trust even his eyes as the events in the city take a turn toward darkness when they see Wesley and Illyria.

Angel: Old Friends #4

Angel and his friends try to find out who is playing tricks on them by finding Lorne, but when another Lorne shows up, who can they trust?

Angel: Old Friends #5

Angel hopes he can trust his friends as conflict approaches with Dr Sparrow, who has been creating doppelgangers of Angel and his old friends.

Continuity

Set after Angel season 5 (after the episode Not Fade Away), and after the comic series, The Curse.

Canonical issues

Angel comics such as this one are not usually considered by fans as canonical. Some fans consider them stories from the imaginations of authors and artists, while other fans consider them as taking place in an alternative fictional reality. However unlike fan fiction, overviews summarising their story, written early in the writing process, were 'approved' by both Fox and Joss Whedon (or his office), and the books were therefore later published as officially Buffy merchandise. Therefore, there is evidence for these comics to represent an (albeit incomplete) continuation of the Angel storyline.

Wesley-Wyndam Pryce died in "Not Fade Away". He does not appear in this comic, instead we see a doppelganger created by Dr Sparrow. (This is also the reason why Cordelia and Fred seem to appear in this comic, both having previously died in "You're Welcome" and "A Hole in the World" respectively).

Old Friends contradicts the story established by Angel: After The Fall, which reveals Gunn has been turned into a vampire and has not lost either of his eyes.

References

Angel (1999 TV series) comics
IDW Publishing titles
2006 comics debuts
Comics about cloning
Comics by Jeff Mariotte